is a Japanese singer, cosplayer, gravure idol, internet personality, actress and from Aichi Prefecture who is affiliated with SP-1. She started her entertainment activities as a cosplayer, gaining popularity on TikTok. In 2020, she made her debut as a gravure model, appearing in magazines such as Weekly Playboy as well as photobooks. In 2021, she made her debut as a television actress, and in 2022 she made her debut as a solo singer, releasing the song "Koi no Yukue" which was used as the ending theme to the anime television series My Dress-Up Darling.

Biography
Akase was born in Aichi Prefecture on July 30, 2001. From an early age, she had an interest in anime, and until she became a junior high school student, she had a dream of appearing in the Pretty Cure franchise. When she was in high school she served as the manager of her school's volleyball club.

After retiring as the club's manager, she decided to take up cosplay due to her interest in anime. Cosplay would also be a way for her to spend money that she had earned from part-time jobs. She then decided to start a TikTok account, which quickly grew in popularity; as of November 2020 she had over 900,000 subscribers. It was also through her TikTok account where she was scouted for entertainment activities via a Twitter direct message. As she had longed to be an actress from childhood, and with the approval of her parents, she accepted the offer.

Akase's professional modelling debut was a swimsuit feature in Shueisha's Weekly Playboy magazine in March 2020. Later that year she released a photobook titled . In 2021 she made her debut as a television actress, appearing in the Fuji TV drama series Mr. Good-looking starring by Fuju Kamio and Shihori Kanjiya. By December 2021, her TikTok subscriber count had surpassed 1.2 million.

In 2022, Akase made her debut as a solo musician, releasing her first single  on February 23, 2022; the title song was used as the ending theme to the anime television series My Dress-Up Darling.

Filmography

Drama
Mr. Good-looking (2021), Yuki Tanaka

Discography

Singles
 (Release date: February 23, 2022)

References

External links
Agency profile 

2001 births
Cosplayers
21st-century Japanese women singers
21st-century Japanese singers
Living people
Models from Aichi Prefecture
Musicians from Aichi Prefecture
TikTokers